Albert Grenier (22 April 1878, Paris – 23 June 1961, Paris) was a French historian, theologian, and archaeologist. He specialized in the history of ancient Rome and the Celts, especially the Gauls.

Works (selection) 
 La Gaule : province romaine.
 Le Génie romain dans la religion, la pensée et l'art, La Renaissance du Livre, Paris, 1925
 Les Gaulois, Petite bibliothèque Payot, Paris, 1970. 
 Quatre villes romaines de Rhénanie : Trèves, Mayence, Bonn, Cologne.
 Manuel d'archéologie gallo-romaine, tome 1 : Généralités et travaux militaires.
 Manuel d'archéologie gallo-romaine, tome 2 : L'Archéologie du sol, les routes, la navigation, l'occupation du sol.

References

20th-century French historians
French archaeologists
Members of the Académie des Inscriptions et Belles-Lettres
Writers from Paris
1878 births
1961 deaths